Edson Alvarado may refer to:

 Edson Alvarado (Mexican footballer) (born 1975), Mexican footballer
 Edson Alvarado (soccer) (born 1998), American soccer player